is a Japanese professional footballer who plays as a centre back for Maruyasu Okazaki.

Club career
Moniwa was born in Atsugi on 8 September 1981. He joined J1 League club Bellmare Hiratsuka (later Shonan Bellmare) from youth team in 1999. Although he played many matches as center back from first season, the club finished at the bottom place and was relegated to J2 League. He became a regular player from summer 2001.

In 2002, Moniwa moved to J1 club FC Tokyo. He played many matches as center back with Jean until 2006. the club won the champions in 2004 J.League Cup which is first major title in the club history. However his opportunity to play decreased for injuries from 2007 and he could only 9 matches in 2009 season.

In 2010, Moniwa moved to Cerezo Osaka. He played many matches as regular center back until 2012. However he lost his opportunity to play for injury from July.

In 2014, Moniwa moved to Thailand and signed with Bangkok Glass.

In 2015, Moniwa returned to Japan and re-joined Cerezo Osaka which was relegated to J2 from 2015 season. Cerezo was at the 4th place in J2 for 2 years in a row and was promoted to J1 end of 2016 season. In 2017, Cerezo finished at 3rd place in J1 League and won the champions in J.League Cup an Emperor's Cup. However he could hardly play in the match in 2017 and he could not play at all in the match in 2018.

On 28 January 2019, Moniwa joined FC Maruyasu Okazaki.

International career
Moniwa made his international debut for Japan in a friendly against Tunisia on 8 October 2003. He scored his first international goal on 3 August 2005 against China PR in an East Asian Cup match.

Moniwa was a member of the Japanese U-23 team at the 2004 Olympics and played full-time in all 3 matches. He was a late entry in Japan's 2006 World Cup squad, being called up after Makoto Tanaka was injured when he was spending his vacation in Hawaii. He replaced Keisuke Tsuboi in the 56th minute of Japan's first match against Australia after Tsuboi developed cramps in both thighs. He played 9 games and scored 1 goal for Japan until 2006.

Career statistics

Club

International

Score and result list Japan's goal tally first, score column indicates score after Moniwa goal.

References

External links
 
 
 Japan National Football Team Database
 

1981 births
Living people
Association football people from Kanagawa Prefecture
Japanese footballers
Japan international footballers
J1 League players
J2 League players
J3 League players
Japan Football League players
Shonan Bellmare players
FC Tokyo players
Cerezo Osaka players
Cerezo Osaka U-23 players
FC Maruyasu Okazaki players
Teruyuki Moniwa
2005 FIFA Confederations Cup players
2006 FIFA World Cup players
Footballers at the 2004 Summer Olympics
Olympic footballers of Japan
Japanese expatriate footballers
Expatriate footballers in Thailand
Japanese expatriate sportspeople in Thailand
Asian Games medalists in football
Footballers at the 2002 Asian Games
Asian Games silver medalists for Japan
Association football defenders
Medalists at the 2002 Asian Games